Richard Lambart, 2nd Earl of the County of Cavan (1628–1690) was Member of Parliament for Kilbeggan between 1647 and 1649.

The title Earl of Cavan was created in the Peerage of Ireland in 1647 for Charles Lambart, 2nd Baron Lambart. Richard was his eldest son by Jane Robartes, daughter of Richard, 1st Baron Robartes and Frances Hender, and sister of John Robartes, 1st Earl of Radnor.

He married Rose Ware, daughter of Sir James Ware and Elizabeth Newman and had issue Charles Lambart, 3rd Earl of Cavan. Rose apparently died in childbirth.

In 1670 Lambart was declared insane, having suffered from a "deep melancholy" for many years. This was attributed by his acquaintances to brooding on the wrongs done to him by his brother Oliver, who had persuaded their father to give him much of Richard's inheritance.

References
 thePeerage.com
Burke's Peerage 107th Edition Delaware 2003

1628 births
1691 deaths
Members of the Parliament of Ireland (pre-1801) for County Westmeath constituencies
Lambart, Richard
Earls of Cavan